Melstar Information Technologies is a professional service and workforce solution provider based in Mumbai, Maharashtra. Is having branch offices at Gurgaon, Chennai, Bangalore.  Its main domains includes Banking, Insurance, Government and IT.

History
It was established in 1986, Mumbai. Till 1998, Melstar has been mainly engaged in trading of hardware. The company shifted its focus to software development in 1998. It was listed on BSE in 2000.

References

External links 
 Mastersoft, Melstar forge partnership
 Melstar

Software companies based in Mumbai
Software companies established in 1986
1986 establishments in Maharashtra
Yash Birla Group
Indian companies established in 1986
Companies listed on the National Stock Exchange of India
Companies listed on the Bombay Stock Exchange